Ildar Salikhovich Minshin (born 5 February 1985) is a Russian track and field athlete who mainly competes in the 3000 metres steeplechase.

He was banned for two years, starting 25 August 2016, due to abnormalities in his biological passport.

International competitions

See also
List of doping cases in athletics

References

External links 
 

1985 births
Living people
Sportspeople from Kaluga
Russian male middle-distance runners
Russian male steeplechase runners
Olympic male steeplechase runners
Olympic athletes of Russia
Athletes (track and field) at the 2008 Summer Olympics
Universiade medalists in athletics (track and field)
Universiade bronze medalists for Russia
Competitors at the 2007 Summer Universiade
Competitors at the 2013 Summer Universiade
Medalists at the 2011 Summer Universiade
World Athletics Championships athletes for Russia
Russian Athletics Championships winners
Doping cases in athletics
Russian sportspeople in doping cases